James Marcus "Lindy" Hood (July 30, 1907 – October 17, 1972) was a college basketball All-American center for the University of Alabama. At Alabama, Hood is noted for being their first All-American men's basketball player in 1931 and as the leader of the undefeated 1929–30 Crimson Tide squad. Hood's nickname "Lindy" came during his playing days with Alabama during a trip to New Orleans to play Tulane. As he entered a hotel lobby, a crowd mistook Hood for Charles Lindbergh and thus the nickname "Lindy" was given to him. Hood was posthumously inducted into the Alabama Sports Hall of Fame in 1990.

References

1907 births
1972 deaths
Alabama Crimson Tide football players
Alabama Crimson Tide men's basketball players
All-American college men's basketball players
American men's basketball players
Basketball players from Alabama
Centers (basketball)
People from Cherokee County, Alabama